Holland Cotter is an art critic with The New York Times. In 2009, he won the Pulitzer Prize for Criticism.

Life and work
Cotter was born in Connecticut and grew up in Boston, Massachusetts.  He earned his A.B. from Harvard College in 1970, where he studied English literature under poet Robert Lowell and was an editor of the Harvard Advocate literary magazine.  His first art course was an anthropology course on primitive art, which led to his first of many visits to Harvard's Peabody Museum of Archaeology and Ethnology.

Cotter earned an MA in American modernism from the City University of New York in 1990 and a M. Phil in early Indian Buddhist art from Columbia University in 1992, where he also taught Indian art and Islamic art.  He has been a writer and editor for the New York Arts Journal, Art in America, and Art News.

Cotter was a freelance writer for the New York Times from 1992 to 1997 before being hired as a full-time art critic in 1998.  Specifically hired for his expertise in Asian art, he is credited with exposing contemporary Indian and Chinese art to a Western audience.  Among his Pulitzer-winning pieces were ones written as a result of a trip to China prompted by the 2008 Summer Olympics, including an examination of the Chinese museum scene and an account of art at the Mogao Caves near Dunhuang. In 2009, he won the Pulitzer Prize for Criticism.

References

External links
 Holland Cotter at The New York Times

Living people
American art critics
American gay writers
Columbia University alumni
Columbia University faculty
Date of birth missing (living people)
Graduate Center, CUNY alumni
Harvard Advocate alumni
Harvard College alumni
Pulitzer Prize for Criticism winners
The New York Times Pulitzer Prize winners
The New York Times writers
Year of birth missing (living people)